Thrypsigenes is a genus of moths in the family Gelechiidae.

Species
 Thrypsigenes colluta Meyrick, 1914
 Thrypsigenes furvescens Meyrick, 1914

References

Gelechiinae